Baron Augustus Schutz (born 1689) was a courtier of German descent at the English court.

He was born in England the son of Louis-Justus Sinoldt dit Schutz, a minister-plenipotentiary of the Duke of Hanover at the Court of St James.

At the age of 16 he went to live in Hanover but returned in 1714 with George I when the latter acceded to the throne of England. He subsequently served George II from 1727 to 1757 as his Master of the Robes and Keeper of the Privy Purse.

He married Penelope Madan and lived at Shotover House in Oxfordshire, which he took over from Lt-Gen. James Tyrell. The Schutzes had 5 sons and 3 daughters; their eldest son George Frederick became a Groom of the Bedchamber to George III.

References

|-

External links
 Picture of Schutz family

1689 births
English courtiers
Year of death unknown
Court of George II of Great Britain